ISACA is an international professional association focused on IT (information technology) governance. On its IRS filings, it is known as the Information Systems Audit and Control Association, although ISACA now goes by its acronym only. ISACA currently offers 8 certification program as well as other micro-certificates.

History
ISACA originated in United States in 1967, when a group of individuals working on auditing controls in computer systems started to become increasingly critical of the operations of their organizations. They identified a need for a centralized source of information and guidance in the field. In 1969, Stuart Tyrnauer, an employee of the (later) Douglas Aircraft Company, incorporated the group as the  Auditors Association (EDPAA). Tyrnauer served as the body's founding chairman for the first three years. In 1976 the association formed an education foundation to undertake large-scale research efforts to expand the knowledge of and value accorded to the fields of governance and control of information technology.

The association became the Information Systems Audit and Control Association in 1994.

 the organization had dropped its long title and branded itself as ISACA.

In March 2016, ISACA bought the CMMI Institute, which is behind the Capability Maturity Model Integration.

In January 2020, ISACA updated and refreshed its look and digital presence, introducing a new logo.

Current status
ISACA currently serves more than 140,000 constituents (members and professionals holding ISACA certifications) in more than 180 countries. The job titles of members are such as IS auditor, consultant, educator, IS security professional, regulator, chief information officer, chief information security officer and internal auditor. They work in nearly all industry categories. There is a network of ISACA chapters with more than 200 chapters established in over 80 countries. Chapters provide education, resource sharing, advocacy, networking and other benefits.

Major publications
 COBIT ISACA Framework
 Frameworks,Standards and Models 
 Blockchain Framework and Guidance
 Risk IT Framework
 IT Audit Framework - (ITAF™): A Professional Practices Framework for IT Audit, 4th Edition
 Business Model for Information Systems (BMIS) 
 Capability Maturity Model Integrated(CMMI)
 Information System Control Journal
 Insights and Expertise  
 Audit Programs and tools
 Publications - over 200 professional publications and Guidance on Audit & Assurance, Emerging Technology, Governance, Information Security, Information Technology, Privacy, Risk. Some of the topics include:
 Artificial Intelligence
 Blockchain
 Certification Exam Prep Guides for CISA, CRISC, CISM, CGEIT, CDPSE, CET and several Certificate Courses
 Cloud Computing
 COBIT
 Compliance
 Cybersecurity
 Data Governance
 Data Science
 Internet of Things
 Network Infrastructure
 Software Development
 Threats and Controls
 Vendor Management
 Young Professionals
 White Papers - Over 200 white papers on a range of contemporary topics
 News and Trends

Certifications
 Certified Information Systems Auditor (CISA,1978)
 Certified Information Security Manager (CISM, 2002)
 Certified in the Governance of Enterprise IT (CGEIT, 2007)
 Certified in Risk and Information Systems Control (CRISC, 2010)
 Cybersecurity Practitioner Certification (CSX-P, 2015)
 Certified Data Privacy Solutions Engineer (CDPSE, 2020)
 Information Technology Certified Associate (ITCA, 2021)
 Certified in Emerging Technology (CET, 2021)

The CSX-P, ISACA's first cybersecurity certification, was introduced in the summer of 2015. It is one of the few certifications that require the individual to work in a live environment, with real problems, to obtain a certification.  Specifically, the exam puts test takers in a live network with a real incident taking place. The student's efforts to respond to the incident and fix the problem results in the type of score awarded.

Certificates
 COBIT Certificates
 IT Risk Fundamentals Certificate
 Certificate in Cloud Auditing Knowledge
 CSX Nexus Cybersecurity Certificates
 Cybersecurity Audit Certificate Program
 Computing Fundamentals Certificate
 Networks and Infrastructure Fundamentals Certificate
 Cybersecurity Fundamental Certificate
 Software Development Fundamentals Certificate
 Data Science Fundamentals Certificate

See also
 Information Security
 Information security management system
 IT risk
 COBIT
 Committee of Sponsoring Organizations of the Treadway Commission (COSO)
 (ISC)²
 Information Systems Security Association
 List of international professional associations

References

External links
ISACA official webpage
Official ISACA CSX webpage

Information technology organizations
Computer security organizations
Auditing organizations
Organizations established in 1967
Professional accounting bodies